The Unnatural World is the second studio album by Connecticut post-punk duo Have a Nice Life. It was released on February 4, 2014, via The Flenser and the band's own record label Enemies List Home Recordings. It is a follow up to 2008's Deathconsciousness and 2010's Time of Land EP.

The tracks "Defenestration Song" and "Burial Society" premiered in December 2013 and January 2014, respectively. The full album was streamed by Pitchfork Media from January 20 to January 27, 2014.

Tracks and musical style
Andrew Sacher and Wyatt Marshall of BrooklynVegan wrote that "the album falls somewhere between goth, noise, shoegaze and post-punk." They also described the album as "addictively melodic for such dark music."

Noisey Vice stated that the song "Burial Society" had "a Nine Inch Nails-meets-post-punk vibe," which "evidenced Have a Nice Life's leanings on the sonic dark side in the record. Lars Gotrich of NPR described the track "Defenestration Song" as "the kind of pitch-black, post-punk party-rocker that'd really turn up at any Goth Night dance." He also wrote: "A two-note guitar riff is barely heard above the dank din as warming feedback permeates the whole affair, like the kind that lulls you to sleep just before an icy death" while comparing the song's rhythm and distorted bass line to the works of the gothic rock pioneers Bauhaus.

Of the track "Dan and Tim, Reunited by Fate", Tiny Mix Tapes wrote that "the pair cherrypick tropes from a number of bleak traditions: reverb-drenched industrial beats; doom-metal sludge; shoegaze drones conjured from effects pedals; post-punk bass chuggery; a plaintive piano+static post-rock crescendo." Tiny Mix Tapes also wrote that the band holds this genre palette together "by matching its compositional ambitions with idiosyncratic recording and production techniques."

Track listing

Personnel
Have a Nice Life
Dan Barrett - performance, writing
Tim Macuga - performance, writing

Production
Kevin Blackler - mastering

References

External links
The Unnatural World on The Flenser Records

2014 albums
Have a Nice Life albums
The Flenser albums